Seychelles competed at the 2000 Summer Olympics in Sydney, Australia.

Athletics 

Men

Women

Judo 

Men

Sailing

Two men and one woman represented Seychelles in the sailing competition.

Men

Women

Open

Swimming 

Two men represented Seychelles in the swimming competition.

Weightlifting 

One woman represented Seychelles in the weightlifting competition.

References
Wallechinsky, David (2004). The Complete Book of the Summer Olympics (Athens 2004 Edition). Toronto, Canada. . 
International Olympic Committee (2001). The Results. Retrieved 12 November 2005.
Sydney Organising Committee for the Olympic Games (2001). Official Report of the XXVII Olympiad Volume 1: Preparing for the Games. Retrieved 20 November 2005.
Sydney Organising Committee for the Olympic Games (2001). Official Report of the XXVII Olympiad Volume 2: Celebrating the Games. Retrieved 20 November 2005.
Sydney Organising Committee for the Olympic Games (2001). The Results. Retrieved 20 November 2005.
International Olympic Committee Web Site

Nations at the 2000 Summer Olympics
2000
2000 in Seychelles